The 1953 Idaho State Bengals football team was an American football team that represented Idaho State University as a member of the Rocky Mountain Conference (RMC) during the 1953 college football season. In their second season under head coach Babe Caccia, the Bengals compiled a 6–2 record (5–0 against conference opponents), won the RMC championship, and outscored opponents by a total of 165 to 141. The team captains were Nolan Ford and Vernon Ravsten.

Schedule

References

Idaho State
Idaho State Bengals football seasons
Rocky Mountain Athletic Conference football champion seasons
Idaho State Bengals football